Incumbent Democrat Teno Roncalio was elected over Republican William Kidd, 51.7% to 48.3%.

Results

References

See also 
 List of United States representatives from Wyoming
 United States House of Representatives elections, 1972

1972
Wyoming
1972 Wyoming elections